The specific strength is a material's (or muscle's) strength (force per unit area at failure) divided by its density.  It is also known as the strength-to-weight ratio or strength/weight ratio or strength-to-mass ratio. In fiber or textile applications, tenacity is the usual measure of specific strength. The SI unit for specific strength is Pa⋅m3/kg, or N⋅m/kg, which is dimensionally equivalent to m2/s2, though the latter form is rarely used. Specific strength has the same units as specific energy, and is related to the maximum specific energy of rotation that an object can have without flying apart due to centrifugal force.

Another way to describe specific strength is breaking length, also known as self support length: the maximum length of a vertical column of the material (assuming a fixed cross-section) that could suspend its own weight when supported only at the top. For this measurement, the definition of weight is the force of gravity at the Earth's surface (standard gravity, 9.80665 m/s2) applying to the entire length of the material, not diminishing with height. This usage is more common with certain specialty fiber or textile applications.

The materials with the highest specific strengths are typically fibers such as carbon fiber, glass fiber and various polymers, and these are frequently used to make composite materials (e.g.  carbon fiber-epoxy). These materials and others such as titanium, aluminium, magnesium and high strength steel alloys are widely used in aerospace and other applications where weight savings are worth the higher material cost.

Note that strength and stiffness are distinct. Both are important in design of efficient and safe structures.

Calculations of breaking length

 

Examples

The data of this table is from best cases, and has been established for giving a rough figure.

Note: Multiwalled carbon nanotubes have the highest tensile strength of any material yet measured, with labs producing them at a tensile strength of 63 GPa, still well below their theoretical limit of 300 GPa. The first nanotube ropes (20 mm long) whose tensile strength was published (in 2000) had a strength of 3.6 GPa, still well below their theoretical limit. The density is different depending on the manufacturing method, and the lowest value is 0.037 or 0.55 (solid).

The 'Yuri' and space tethers
The International Space Elevator Consortium uses the "Yuri" as a name for the SI units describing specific strength.  Specific strength is of fundamental importance in the description of space elevator cable materials. One Yuri is conceived to be the SI unit for yield stress (or breaking stress) per unit of density of a material under tension.  One Yuri equals 1 Pa⋅m3/kg or 1 N⋅m/kg, which is the breaking/yielding force per linear density of the cable under tension.  A functional Earth space elevator would require a tether of 30–80 megaYuri (corresponding to 3100–8200 km of breaking length).

Fundamental limit on specific strength
The null energy condition places a fundamental limit on the specific strength of any material. The specific strength is bounded to be no greater than c2 ~ , where c is the speed of light. 
This limit is achieved by electric and magnetic field lines, QCD flux tubes, and the fundamental strings hypothesized by string theory.

Tenacity (textile strength)

Tenacity is the customary measure of strength of a fiber or yarn. It is usually defined as the ultimate (breaking) force of the fiber (in gram-force units) divided by the denier.
Because denier is a measure of the linear density, the tenacity works out to be not a measure of force per unit area, but rather a quasi-dimensionless measure analogous to specific strength. 
A tenacity of  corresponds to: 
Mostly Tenacity expressed in report as cN/tex.

See also
 Specific modulus
 Space elevator
 Space tether

References

External links
 Specific stiffness - Specific strength chart, University of Cambridge, Department of Engineering

Engineering ratios
Materials science
Solid mechanics